Chandima Weerakkody MP (born 23 May 1968) is a Member of Parliament representing the Galle District. He is currently a member of parliament representing Galle district.

Chandima was the former Cabinet Minister of Petroleum & Petroleum Gas.

He was also the Deputy Speaker of the 14th Parliament of Sri Lanka and Chairman of Committees.

Early life and family
He is a lawyer by profession and was educated at St. Aloysius' College, Galle and Nalanda College Colombo.

References

Special correspondent 

1968 births
Living people
Sri Lankan Buddhists
Sinhalese lawyers
Alumni of Nalanda College, Colombo
United People's Freedom Alliance politicians
Members of the 13th Parliament of Sri Lanka
Members of the 14th Parliament of Sri Lanka
Members of the 15th Parliament of Sri Lanka
Members of the 16th Parliament of Sri Lanka
Sri Lanka Podujana Peramuna politicians
People from Galle
Alumni of St. Aloysius' College, Galle
Deputy speakers and chairmen of committees of the Parliament of Sri Lanka